Raja is a village in Mulgi Parish, Viljandi County in southern Estonia. As of 2011 Census, the village's population was 28.

References

Villages in Viljandi County